America's Water Infrastructure Act of 2018 (AWIA) is a United States federal law, enacted during the 115th United States Congress, which provides for water infrastructure improvements throughout the country in the areas of:
 flood control
 navigable waterways
 water resources development
 maintenance and repair of dams and reservoirs
 ecosystem restoration
 public water systems
 financing of improvements
 hydropower development
 technical assistance to small communities.

The law also reauthorizes the Water Infrastructure Finance and Innovation Act of 2014 (WIFIA) which provides expanded financial assistance to communities under the Clean Water Act and Safe Drinking Water Act. These programs are administered by the U.S. Environmental Protection Agency (EPA).

Summary of current EPA actions 
 Modifications to the Drinking Water State Revolving Fund
 Community Water System risk and resilience assessments
 Implementation of amendments to the Emergency Planning and Community Right-to-Know Act
 Administration of funding for the Water Infrastructure Improvements for the Nation (WIIN) Act grant programs
 Development of infrastructure asset management and capacity development strategies for state agencies and public water systems.

Upcoming EPA actions 

 Water System Restructuring Rule
 Small System Report to Congress

SWIFIA
Section 4201 of the Act authorised the creation of the state infrastructure financing authority WIFIA (SWIFIA) program. This is a loan program established to support State infrastructure financing authority borrowers, administered by EPA.

Minneapolis Courthouse
Also included in the law is the designation of the United States courthouse located at 300 South Fourth Street in Minneapolis, Minnesota, as the "Diana E. Murphy United States Courthouse".

References

External links 
 America’s Water Infrastructure Act of 2018 (PDF/details) as amended in the GPO Statute Compilations collection
 America’s Water Infrastructure Act of 2018 (PDF/details) as enacted in the US Statutes at Large

Acts of the 115th United States Congress
2018 in the environment
United States federal environmental legislation
Water law in the United States
Water pollution in the United States